Soufflé Rothschild is a sweet soufflé created by Marie-Antoine Carême. The dish was named for James Mayer de Rothschild. The original  recipe included candied fruit that had been macerated in Danziger Goldwasser before the dish was cooked; later recipes replace Goldwasser with kirsch, cognac or Grand Marnier.

References

French desserts